Commotria albistria is a species of snout moth in the genus Commotria. It was described by Anthonie Johannes Theodorus Janse in 1922. It is found in Zimbabwe.

References

Endemic fauna of Zimbabwe
Moths described in 1922
Anerastiini
Lepidoptera of Zimbabwe
Moths of Sub-Saharan Africa